Topoloveni is a town in Argeș County, Romania on the Cârcinov River. The town administers four villages: Boțârcani, Crintești, Gorănești and Țigănești. It is situated in the historical region of Muntenia.

The oldest document in which Topoloveni is mentioned is dated 19 June 1421, during the rule of Radu II Chelul. Its name is derived from a Slavic word, topol, meaning "poplar".

Demographics 
According to the national population and housing census in 2011, 10,219 inhabitants were recorded as residents of the five component localities of Topoloveni, as follows: Topoloveni - 4,023, Țigănești - 418, Gorănești - 344, Crintești - 394 and Boțârcani - 361. More recent demographic data accounts for a total of 9,232 residents of Topoloveni.

Natives
Dan Ghica-Radu
Ion Mihalache

References

Populated places in Argeș County
Towns in Romania
Localities in Muntenia
Place names of Slavic origin in Romania